Mohsen Mosalman (born 27 January 1991) is an Iranian football player who plays as an attacking midfielder.

He was also a member of the Iran national football team and was the captain of the Iran U23 team. A play-making midfielder, he is known for his passing and dribbling skills on the ball. He also holds the record for being the youngest scorer in the Iran Pro League.

Club career

Zob Ahan 
He made his debut in the 2007–08 season in a match against Bargh Shiraz, in which he scored his first goal. This makes him the youngest player in Iran's Premier Football League when he was only 16 years old and his immense goalscoring capability. He scored another goal, against Persepolis in Azadi Stadium and became the youngest player that have scored to Persepolis.

He was one of the most promising young players in the season and continued his good performances in 2008–09 season for Zob Ahan. In 2009–10 season, he was not a starting line up player.

Loan to Malavan 
In 2010–11 season, he was loaned to Malavan to end his conscription career. He was one of the started players for Malavan in the season with his assists.

After spend two years at Malavan as loan, he returned to Zob Ahan at the end of the 2011–12 season.

Loan to Persepolis 
He joined Persepolis on loan until the end of the 2013–14 season on 18 November 2013. He made his debut in a match against Tractor Sazi which Persepolis defeated 0–1. Two weeks later, he scored his first goal for Persepolis in a 6–0 away victory over Mes Kerman.

Loan to Foolad 

After the end of the loan contract and his return from Persepolis to Zobahan, he was loaned to another team again. Mosalman left for Foolad on loan.

Persepolis 
In the summer of 2015 Persepolis paid a fee of €80,000 euros to Zob Ahan and signed Mosalman on a 2–year contract. Mosalman scored his first Persepolis goal in the Tehran derby in a historic 4–2 victory against Esteghlal. He scored his first Asian goal on 21 February 2017 in a 1–1 draw against Saudi club Al Hilal in a group stage match.

Return to Zob Ahan 
He rejected bids from Persepolis and Sepahan in favor of Zob Ahan stay. He joined ZOBAHAN F.C on june 7th / 2018 again after leaving Perspolis.

Sepahan 
In 2018, Mosalman joined Sepahan.

But he could not shine in the Isfahani team as he did during his time in Persepolis, and left Sepahan after a not so good performance.

Saipa 
In 2020,He joined to the Saipa F.C.

International career

Under-22 

He was called up by Ali Reza Mansourian to participate in the team's training camp in Italy. He captained the Iran national under-23 football team. He was named in the Iran U23 final list for Incheon 2014.

Senior 

On 3 October 2011, he was called up to the Iran national team by Carlos Queiroz. Two days later, he made his debut for Iran against Palestine.

Statistics

Club career statistics 

 Assist Goals

International goals 

Scores and results list Iran's goal tally first.

Honours 
Zob Ahan
Persian Gulf Pro League Runner-up (2): 2008–09, 2009–10
Hazfi Cup (1): 2008–09
AFC Champions League Runner-up (1): 2010

Persepolis
Persian Gulf Pro League (2): 2016–17, 2017–18 ; Runner-up (2): 2013–14, 2015–16
Iranian Super Cup (1): 2017
AFC Champions League Runner-up (1): 2018

Sephan
Persian Gulf Pro League Runner-up (1): 2018–19

Individual 
Persian Gulf Pro League Top Assists: 2017–18

References

External links 

Persian League Profile

Mohsen Mosalman at FOXSPORTS
Mohsen Mosalman at FFIRI
Mohsen Mosalman at EuroSport

1991 births
Living people
Iranian footballers
Association football forwards
Persian Gulf Pro League players
Zob Ahan Esfahan F.C. players
Malavan players
Foolad FC players
Persepolis F.C. players
Sportspeople from Tehran
Iran under-20 international footballers
Footballers at the 2010 Asian Games
Footballers at the 2014 Asian Games
Asian Games competitors for Iran